Daub or Daube may refer to:

 Daub or Daube, a surname
 Wattle and daub, dwelling construction technique and materials, using woven latticework daubed with a sand, clay and/or dung mixture
 Daube, a type of stew in French cuisine 
 Daube, the puck in Ice stock sport
 Daube glacé, a jellied stew appetizer in New Orleans cuisine
 Biskra Airport (IATA airport code: BSK; ICAO airport code: DAUB) in Algeria

See also
 Dauber (disambiguation)
 Taube (disambiguation)
 Taubes
 Taube
 Taub